Springheeled Jack is a British small press comic by David Hitchcock, based on the folklore character of Spring Heeled Jack.

In 2006 it also appeared in the small press section of the Judge Dredd Megazine #245.

Publication

It was released as a three issue comic followed by other one-shots, which were collected in a hardback volume Strange Visitor.

Hitchcock also supplied a Springheeled Jack cover to Redeye #4, in which the character was featured.

Awards

2005 won the Eagle Award for Favourite Black & White Comic Book - British

See also

British small press comics
History of the British comic
London Falling, a comic also based on figures from British folklore.

References

External links
The Real Mainstream
Special Thursday Update - Bristol 2003 Part Four: Springing At Cats
Going 'Round In Con-Centric Circles...
Springs and Round-Ups - More Barbaric Books from Bristol!
A Ripping Good Time: Whitechapel Freak, overview of another Victorian-set comic from Hancock

British small press comics
British comics titles